Arrogate (April 11, 2013June 2, 2020) was an American Thoroughbred racehorse who won the 2016 Travers Stakes in a track record time in his first stakes appearance. He then won the Breeders' Cup Classic and was named the American Champion Three-Year-Old Male Horse and World's Best Racehorse of 2016. To start his four-year-campaign, he won the 2017 Pegasus World Cup in a new track record followed by a win in the Dubai World Cup. On returning to the United States however, he suffered three straight defeats and retired with a record of seven wins from eleven starts. Despite having only four stakes race wins, the large purses for these wins made him the all-time leading money earner in North America.

Background
Arrogate was a gray horse bred in Kentucky by Clearsky Farms. As a yearling, the colt was consigned to the Keeneland September sale and was bought for $560,000 by Juddmonte Farms, the racing operation of Khalid ibn Abdullah. Arrogate was sent into training with Bob Baffert in California. Arrogate's front teeth were knocked back as a yearling, probably after being kicked by another horse. One tooth became infected and was removed, which slowed down his eating but otherwise had no impact.

Arrogate was sired by the Breeders' Cup Juvenile winner Unbridled's Song, whose other major winners have included Will Take Charge, the sprinter Zensational and Breeders' Cup winners Unrivaled Belle and Unbridled Elaine. Arrogate's dam Bubbler was a successful racemare who won six of her nine races.

Racing career

2016: three-year-old season
Arrogate made his track debut in a six-furlong maiden race at Los Alamitos Race Course on April 17, 2016. Ridden by Martin Garcia, he started the odds-on favorite but finished third behind Westbrook and Accelerate. He was partnered in this race by Rafael Bejarano, who rode him in his next two races. Nineteen days later, at the same track, Arrogate contested an allowance race against older horses and won again, beating Fusaichi Samurai by five and a quarter lengths after leading from start. On August 4, the colt appeared in an allowance race at Del Mar and started odd-on favorite against two older opponents. After racing in third place in the early running, he took the lead in the straight and won by one and three quarter lengths.

On August 27, Arrogate was moved up sharply in class to contest the Grade I Travers Stakes at Saratoga Race Course in which his rivals included Exaggerator and Creator, winners respectively of the Preakness Stakes and the Belmont Stakes. Bejarano elected to ride another of Baffert's horses, American Freedom, so veteran jockey Mike Smith picked up the ride. Having drawn post position 1 in a large field, Arrogate was ridden hard from the starting gate and set fast opening fractions. As they turned into the stretch, he broke clear of his rivals, eventually winning by thirteen and a half lengths over his stablemate American Freedom, with Creator finishing seventh and Exaggerator eleventh.

His final time of 1:59.36 for the  distance eclipsed General Assembly's Travers and track record of 2:00 that had stood for 37 years. Baffert said, "You're always hoping that they're that good. I knew he was good, but I didn't know he was really, really that kind of good."  The horse earned a Beyer Speed Figure of 122 for his effort and became a contender for the year end Eclipse award.

On November 5, Arrogate entered the Breeders' Cup Classic as the second favorite behind 5-year-old California Chrome.  ‘Chrome led from the outset, while Arrogate tracked sitting third.  The two horses engaged in the homestretch and in the final yards, Arrogate surged ahead to defeat California Chrome by a half a length at the finish. The two horses dominated the remainder of the field by over 10 lengths.  Art Sherman said of Arrogate, "That winner is the real McCoy, I knew he was the one we had to beat, but I didn't know how good he was."  Post race analysis gave California Chrome a Beyer Speed Figure of 119, the highest of his career, but Arrogate topped it with a 120.

The race earned Arrogate the top position in the World's Best Racehorse Rankings published by the International Federation of Horseracing Authorities on November 10 with a rating of 134, one point ahead of California Chrome. Arrogate was voted the Eclipse Award as American Champion Three-Year-Old Male Horse.

2017: four-year-old season
Arrogate was originally scheduled to begin his four-year-old campaign in the San Pasqual Stakes but heavy rains at Santa Anita caused Baffert to scratch from the race. Instead, he trained Arrogate up to the $12 million Pegasus World Cup at Gulfstream Park on January 28, 2017. The race was promoted as a final matchup with California Chrome, who was retiring to stud after the race. Both horses were compromised by the post position draw. Arrogate drew post position one and risked getting trapped along the rail in traffic. California Chrome drew the outside post position which caused him to be carried wide in the first turn. California Chrome eventually settled behind the early leaders alongside Arrogate but could not respond when the latter made his move, possibly having wrenched his leg early in the race. California Chrome was eased to prevent the possibility of further injury and finished ninth. Meanwhile, Arrogate swept to the lead and drew off to win by nearly five lengths over longshot Shaman Ghost. The timing of the race proved controversial. The original time, measured by Trakus based on transmitters in the horses' saddlecloths, was 1:47.61. However, clocking experts hand-timed the race almost a second faster, at around 1:46.9. The timing controversy caused the Beyer Speed Figure for Arrogate to be increased from 116 to 119. Gulfstream did a frame-by-frame video analysis and determined the correct time was 1:46.83, a new track record.

Arrogate made his next start on March 25 in the Dubai World Cup at Meydan Racecourse. He broke poorly and was then squeezed between other horses, causing him to drop to the back of the fourteen horse field. Baffert feared the colt had lost all chance but Mike Smith reacted calmly, saying later that he rode him like Zenyatta, who was famous for her closing kick. Once Arrogate recovered his stride, Smith took him to the outside of the field and started to steadily make up ground. When they entered the stretch, Arrogate started to close rapidly and moved by Gun Runner to win by  lengths. His share of the $10 million purse took his career prize-winning to $17,084,600, a North American record. "Everybody who was here tonight is going to say, 'I'm glad I was here to see that,'" said Baffert. "If anybody wasn't super impressed with that, they just don't like horse racing. I still can't believe he won the race."

After returning to the United States, Arrogate was given some time off then was entered in the San Diego Handicap at Del Mar on July 22 where he carried the top weight of 126 pounds. Heavily favored at odds of 1–20, his main rival in a field of five was Accelerate, whose main claim to fame at the time was finishing second ahead of Arrogate in their April 2016 maiden race. However, Arrogate unexpectedly finished fourth, over fifteen lengths behind Accelerate. Mike Watchmaker, a handicapper writing for the Daily Racing Form commented, "He lacked any interest in getting involved in the run to or around the first turn, and the little move he made on the far turn was actually an optical illusion." Another writer called it the biggest upset in the history of Del Mar. "He gallops and works faster than that," said Smith. "I'm dumbfounded."

Arrogate was next entered in the Pacific Classic on August 19, also at Del Mar. Facing off against six other horses, Arrogate stalked the pace set by his stablemate Collected for much of the race, then began to close in on him in the stretch. However, it was not enough to catch Collected, who won by half a length. Following the race, Baffert said it felt "weird" that Collected had won and not Arrogate. "I feel like my older son was beaten by my younger son," he told the Daily Racing Form.

Baffert trained Arrogate up to the 2017 Breeders' Cup Classic on November 4, a layoff of over two months. Arrogate put in several good workouts at his training base in Santa Anita, but handicappers were still concerned about his ability to handle the Del Mar track at which the Classic would be held. Arrogate drew post position one for the race, and Smith announced his intention to be aggressive out of the starting gate in order to avoid being trapped on the rail. Arrogate was made the 2–1 second choice on the morning line behind Gun Runner, who had won three straight Grade I races since returning from Dubai. Unfortunately, Arrogate ducked in at the start and lost ground to the rest of the field. He was never a factor in the race and finished in a dead heat for fifth, 7 1/2 lengths behind Gun Runner.

Smith blamed the loss on Arrogate's dislike for the Del Mar surface. "He just won't run over here. I've tried to talk myself into thinking he would. He has just showed me time and time again that he wouldn't." Baffert said that Arrogate was "like a pitcher who can't find the plate. ... He's just not the horse he was."

Race record

Notes:

An (*) asterisk after the odds means Arrogate was the post-time favorite.

Retirement and stud career
Arrogate was retired following the Classic. Juddmonte Farm announced his fee for 2018 would be $75,000.

In the last week of May 2020 Arrogate's stud schedule was suspended when he appeared to be suffering from soreness in his neck. He then fell in his stall, was unable to get back to his feet, and was sent for treatment at the Hagyard Clinic. After four days of  tests and unsuccessful treatment, he was euthanized on June 2. A statement issued by Juddmonte said "His will to fight, so valuable to him on the racetrack, became a challenge in his care. When serious secondary health issues set in, the decision was made to put him to sleep."

Arrogate's first win as a sire was when Adversity broke her maiden at Saratoga on 7 September 2021. Less than an hour later, his second winner was Affable Monarch who won a maiden race.

Notable progeny

c = colt, f = filly, g = gelding

Pedigree

Arrogate is inbred 4 × 4 to Mr Prospector, meaning that this stallion appears twice in the fourth generation of his pedigree.

See also
 List of leading Thoroughbred racehorses
 List of historical horses

References 

2013 racehorse births
2020 racehorse deaths
Breeders' Cup Classic winners
Dubai World Cup winners
Eclipse Award winners
Grade 1 stakes race winners
Racehorses bred in Kentucky
Racehorses trained in the United States
Horse racing track record setters
Thoroughbred family 16-g